The Voigtländer Ultramatic CS was the first 35mm leaf shutter SLR camera with TTL metering. The design of the not too heavy camera was derived from the Voigtländer viewfinder cameras, with rounded sides and a shifter on the front side as shutter release. Its designer was Walter Swarofsky. A specialty of the camera was that shutter speed and aperture were controlled by rings around the bayonet. The lenses had only a distance control ring. The bayonet is a variant of the Deckel bayonet (DKL) offering mechanical control of both, aperture release and automatic aperture setting. The Septon 1:2/50mm was a well regarded lens, and like the Skopagon 2.0/40mm it was a quite fast lens for that type of SLR. The exposure delay  was only 1/50 sec.

See also
Voigtländer Bessamatic

Ultramatic CS
135 film cameras